Jean Chastel (31 March 1708 – 1790) was a farmer and inn-keeper from the province of Gévaudan in France, noted for killing the Beast of Gévaudan on 19 June 1767 at Mont Mouchet.

Chastel appeared as a character in the Brotherhood of the Wolf film.

Chastel is also a werewolf in Patricia Briggs' novel Hunting Ground. In this, he is both the Beast of Gévaudan and Jean Chastel. The werewolf known as Jean Chastel, after being threatened by the Marrok, stops hunting humans openly, and takes credit for the death of The Beast. Chastel continues to hunt humans, specifically women and children, but is more subtle.

In the 2016 novel Loup-Garou: The Beast of Harmony Falls by David Reuben Aslin, Chastel appears as a werewolf who terrorizes the local population.

References 

1708 births
1790 deaths
People from Haute-Loire
French farmers
18th-century French people
18th-century farmers